Troughton is a surname, and may refer to

 Alice Troughton, British film and television director, not related to Patrick Troughton
 Bob Troughton (1904–1988), Australian rules footballer
 Charles Troughton (1916–1991), British businessman 
 David Troughton (born 1950), English actor and son of Patrick Troughton
 Edward Troughton (1753–1835), British instrument maker
 Ellis Le Geyt Troughton (1893–1974), Australian zoologist 
 Jim Troughton (born 1979), English cricketer and grandson of Patrick Troughton
 Lionel Troughton (1879–1933), English cricketer
 Michael Troughton (born 1955), English actor and son of Patrick Troughton
 Patrick Troughton (1920–1987), English actor best known for his role in Doctor Who
 Sam Troughton (born 1977), English actor and grandson of Patrick Troughton
 Sammy Troughton (born 1964), Northern Irish footballer

See also
 Troughton & Simms, company founded by Edward Troughton
 Cooke, Troughton & Simms, the same company post-merger